The Church of St James in Halse, Somerset, England dates from the Norman period and is dedicated St James the Less. It has been designated as a Grade I listed building.

The church includes some 12th and 13th century work, including the tower, but the current building was mainly built in the 15th century. The north aisle was built around 1546 and the church was restored in 1900. The brickwork is red sandstone which was laid down during the Triassic Period, with dressings of Hamstone.

The interior includes a fan-vaulted rood screen, which was previously larger but parts of it were removed in 1803.

The Anglican parish is within the benefice of Milverton with Halse, Fitzhead and Ash Priors within the archdeaconry of Taunton.

See also

 List of Grade I listed buildings in Taunton Deane
 List of towers in Somerset
 List of ecclesiastical parishes in the Diocese of Bath and Wells

References

External links
 Church of St James from Parish web site

15th-century church buildings in England
Church of England church buildings in Taunton Deane
Grade I listed churches in Somerset
Grade I listed buildings in Taunton Deane